Samsung Galaxy Round is an Android phablet smartphone produced by Samsung Electronics. Unveiled in October 2013, it is a curved variation of the Galaxy Note 3 that was distinguished by being the first commercially produced smartphone to feature a flexible AMOLED display. It launched exclusively on SK Telecom in South Korea on 10 October 2013.

Specifications 
The Galaxy Round's design and hardware is based heavily upon the Galaxy Note 3, featuring the same overall design (including a plastic leather rear cover.  The device was made available only in a "Luxury Brown" color), but the entire body is curved inward length-wise, is slightly thinner and lighter in comparison, and does not include a stylus. Similarly to the Note 3, the Galaxy Round includes a 2.3 GHz quad-core Qualcomm Snapdragon 800 system-on-chip with 3 GB of RAM, a 5.7-inch 1080p Super AMOLED display, and a 13-megapixel rear-facing camera. The Galaxy Round includes a removable, 2,800 mAh battery.

The Galaxy Round shipped with Android 4.3 "Jelly Bean" and Samsung's proprietary TouchWiz user interface and software. It contains additional features meant to leverage the curved body, such as "Quick Glance", which displays a clock and notifications when the phone is pushed upwards on one of its sides, and going back and forward between songs in the Samsung music player app by bouncing the left or right side of the phone respectively while in standby.

Reception 
CNET praised the device for its inheritance of the "top-tier" hardware of the Note 3 and its innovative form factor, noting that it had "subtle slants and attention to ergonomic detail", and produced less glare when watching videos. The Galaxy Round was considered to be "[an] ergonomically minded high-end smartphone [that] offers practical, real-world benefits" and "opens the door to a lot of interesting and potentially useful applications for any electronic device topped with a touch screen".

See also
 Samsung Galaxy Note Edge
 LG G Flex

References

Samsung mobile phones
Samsung Galaxy
Mobile phones introduced in 2013
Android (operating system) devices
Mobile phones with infrared transmitter